Anthidium maculifrons is a species of bee in the family Megachilidae, the leaf-cutter, carder, or mason bees.

Distribution
Middle America and North America:
United States
Mexico

Synonyms
Synonyms for this species include:
Anthidium cognatum Cresson, 1878
Anthidium zamoranicum Cockerell, 1949

References

External links
Anatomical illustrations and photos

maculifrons
Insects described in 1854